Gooch is a surname. Gooch or the Gooch is also a nickname. It may refer to:

Surname

People
 See Gooch baronets for a list of baronets with the surname (some are listed below)
 Alexander Gooch (died 1558), English Protestant martyr
 Arthur Gooch (footballer) (born 1931), former Australian rules footballer
 Sir Arthur Gooch, 14th Baronet (born 1937), English baronet and retired British Army officer
 Arthur Gooch (criminal) (died 1936), American criminal and the only person ever executed under the Lindbergh kidnapping law
 Barnabas Gooch (died c. 1626),  English lawyer, academic, Vice-Chancellor of the University of Cambridge and Member of Parliament
 Brad Gooch (born 1952), American writer
 Brison D. Gooch (1925–2014), American historian
 Charmian Gooch (born 1965), British anti-corruption campaigner and activist
 Daniel Gooch (1816–1889), English chief mechanical engineer and chairman of the Great Western Railway
 Daniel Linn Gooch (1853–1913), U.S. Representative from Kentucky
 Daniel W. Gooch (1820–1891), U.S. Representative from Massachusetts
 Edwin Gooch (1869–1964), British politician and trade union leader
 Frank Austin Gooch (1852–1929), American chemist and engineer
 George Peabody Gooch (1873–1968), British journalist, historian and politician
 Graham Gooch (born 1953), English cricketer
 Henry Gooch (Conservative politician) (1871–1959), British barrister, educationalist and politician
 Jeff Gooch (born 1974), American former National Football League player
 Jim Gooch (politician) (born 1951), American politician
 Jimmy Gooch (footballer) (1921–2001), English football goalkeeper
 Joe Gooch (born 1977), English singer and guitarist
 John Viret Gooch (1812–1900), locomotive superintendent of the London and South Western Railway
 Johnny Gooch (1897–1975), American Major League Baseball player and minor league player, manager, pitching coach and scout
 Jon Gooch (born 1984), English musician, record producer and DJ
 Keith Gooch (born 1959), former Canadian Football League player
 Lee Gooch (1890–1966), American Major League Baseball player and college head coach
 Lynden Gooch (born 1995), American footballer in England
 Martin Gooch (born 1972), British filmmaker
 Peter Gooch (born 1949), English former cricketer
 Robert Gooch (1784–1830), English physician
 Sir Robert Gooch, 11th Baronet (1903–1978), British Army colonel
 Robert Kent Gooch (1893–1982), American college football quarterback and political science professor
 Stan Gooch (1932–2010), British psychologist
 Steve Gooch (born 1967), American politician
 Talor Gooch (born 1991), American golfer
 Thomas Gooch (disambiguation)
 Tiny Gooch (1903–1986), American all-around college athlete, attorney, and politician
 U. L. Gooch (1923–2021), American aviator, aviation entrepreneur, and politician
 Sir William Gooch, 1st Baronet (1681–1751), colonial Governor of Virginia
 William Gooch (astronomer) (1770–1792), English astronomer on the Vancouver Expedition

Fictional characters
 Stephanie Gooch, on the television series Scrubs
 The Gooch, an unseen character on the television series Diff'rent Strokes
 The Gooch, an occasional character on the New Zealand  television series Outrageous Fortune, portrayed by Karl Willetts.
Steve "Gooch" Yamaguchi, an supporting character in The Epic Tales of Captain Underpants

Nickname
 Colm Cooper, nicknamed "The Gooch" senior Kerry GAA Gaelic football player
 Devin Setoguchi, nicknamed "The Gooch", NHL player for the Minnesota Wild
 Oguchi Onyewu, nicknamed "Gooch", association football player for the United States National Team and Sporting Portugal

See also
 Gooch crucible, a sintered glass crucible
 Gooch valve for steam locomotives
Goochland (disambiguation)

Lists of people by nickname